Nikola Gatarić (born 9 March 1992) is a Croatian professional footballer who plays as a winger for Austrian Regionalliga side SV Stripfing/Weiden.

References

External links
 
 FC Nitra official club profile 
 Futbalnet profile 
 

1992 births
Living people
Footballers from Zagreb
Association football wingers
Croatian footballers
NK Sesvete players
NK Zelina players
NK Lučko players
FC Solothurn players
NK Brežice 1919 players
SV Oberachern players
NK Krško players
NK Celje players
1. FC Tatran Prešov players
ŠKF Sereď players
FC Nitra players
Ermis Aradippou FC players
First Football League (Croatia) players
Swiss 1. Liga (football) players
Oberliga (football) players
Slovenian Second League players
Slovenian PrvaLiga players
Slovak Super Liga players
Cypriot First Division players
Austrian Regionalliga players
Croatian expatriate footballers
Expatriate footballers in Switzerland
Croatian expatriate sportspeople in Switzerland
Expatriate footballers in Slovenia
Croatian expatriate sportspeople in Slovenia
Expatriate footballers in Germany
Croatian expatriate sportspeople in Germany
Expatriate footballers in Slovakia
Croatian expatriate sportspeople in Slovakia
Expatriate footballers in Cyprus
Croatian expatriate sportspeople in Cyprus
Expatriate footballers in Austria
Croatian expatriate sportspeople in Austria